Harned is an unincorporated community in Breckinridge County, Kentucky, United States. Harned has a post office with ZIP code 40144.

History
A post office was established in the community, then known as Layman, on June 6, 1890. Six months later it was named for early local land owner Henry Harned, a native of Virginia who moved there shortly after the Civil War and donated the site for the depot and gave a right-of-way for the Louisville, Hardinsburg & Western Railroad.

References

Unincorporated communities in Breckinridge County, Kentucky
Unincorporated communities in Kentucky